Malcolm McNulty (born 7 December 1951) is an English musician, vocalist and guitarist, best known as vocalist with Hazzard, bass player then vocalist with Sweet, and was a vocalist and guitarist with Slade from 2005 to 2019.

Biography 
McNulty was born in Liverpool in December 1951. He joined German heavy rock band Hazzard in 1984, which had been formed by Herman Frank, formerly of Accept, and recorded their debut album Hazzard.  In 1985, he was invited to join legendary British glam rockers Sweet, where he played bass before taking over vocals, recording the albums Live at the Marquee, A and Alive & Giggin'! as well as the singles "X-Ray-Specs" and "Stand Up".   He left the band in 1994.  During his time with Sweet, he also collaborated on the side project  Paddy Goes to Holyhead with Andy Scott (also of Sweet), releasing the singles "The Green Green Grass of Home" and "Delilah" in 1987.   He also played session bass and sang backing vocals for Norwegian Ole I'Dole on This Ole Town.   In 2005 he joined veteran Wolverhampton/Walsall rockers Slade on vocals and guitar, taking over from Steve Whalley.

Discography

Singles 
Paddy Goes to Holyhead
 1987 – The Green Green Grass of Home (Jackeen Records)
 1987 – Delilah (Rage Records)

Sweet
 1991 – X-Ray-Specs (SPV Records)
 1992 – Stand Up (SPV Records)

Albums 
Hazzard
 1984 – Hazzard (Mausoleum Records)

Ole
 1987 – This Ole Town (Mercury)

Sweet
 1986 – Live at the Marquee (SPV Records)
 1992 – A (SPV Records), now re-released as The Answer 
 1995 – Alive & Giggin'! (Pseudonym)
 2013 – The Answer (Angel Air)

Videos 
Sweet
 1986 – Live at the Marquee (SPV Records)
 1992 – Live at the Capitol (SPV Records)

Slade
 2015 – Live at Koko (Wienerworld)

References

External links
 Hazzard at the Encyclopedia Metallum
 Andy Scott's Sweet Official Website 
 Paddy Goes to Holyhead Official Website
 Slade Official Website
 Slade 40 Years on Official Website

1951 births
English rock bass guitarists
English male guitarists
Male bass guitarists
English rock singers
Living people
Musicians from Liverpool